Gun Fight is a 1961 Western directed by Edward L. Cahn
for Robert E. Kent's Zenith Productions that was released through United Artists.  The film features location shots from the Grand Teton National Park. Gun Fight is an almost identical remake of the 1956 film Gun Brothers starring Buster Crabbe and Neville Brand.

Plot
First Sergeant Wayne Santley has finished his final enlistment with the 7th Cavalry and is looking forward to going into business with his brother Brad in Wyoming who has told him he has a large ranch with 2,000 head of cattle.  He discovers that his brother and his associates are in a much different kind of business that Wayne wants no part of.

Cast
James Brown   as  Wayne Santley 
Joan Staley   as Nora Blaine 
Gregg Palmer   as  Brad Santley 
Ron Soble  as  Pawnee 
Ken Mayer  as Joe Emery 
Walter Coy   as  Sheriff
James Parnell as Moose McLain

See also
 List of American films of 1961

References

External links

1961 films
American black-and-white films
American Western (genre) films
1961 Western (genre) films
Films directed by Edward L. Cahn
United Artists films
Films produced by Edward Small
Films scored by Paul Sawtell
1960s English-language films
1960s American films
Films with screenplays by Richard Schayer
Films set in Wyoming
Films shot in Wyoming